Boletus kermesinus is a species of bolete fungus. The fruit bodies are dark red with a sticky cap, and have a reticulate stem. Newly described in 2011, the fungus is known only from central Honshu, Japan, where it grows in subalpine coniferous forests.

See also
List of Boletus species

References

External links
 

kermesinus
Fungi described in 2011
Fungi of Asia